Afon y Maes is a tributary river to the Clwyd and flows through the village of Llanelidan, Denbighshire, Wales.

Llanelidan
Rivers of Denbighshire